Martin's Point Bridge spans the Presumpscot River in Maine, United States, near the river’s mouth with Casco Bay. It connects Falmouth Foreside, at Mackworth Point, in the north, to the East Deering neighborhood of Portland, at Martin's Point, in the south.  in length, it carries vehicular and pedestrian traffic of U.S. Route 1. The bridge is two lanes, including a bicycle lane in each, with a pedestrian lane on the eastern side. A similar plan for the western side of the bridge was abandoned.

Route 1 joins I-295 a short distance to the south at the Veranda Street interchange.

The first bridge was erected in 1828. Today's bridge, completed in 2014, is the fifth iteration, replacing one that was built in 1943.

As of 2015, the bridge carries around 15,000 vehicles each day. It is part of the 3,000-mile long East Coast Greenway connecting Maine and Florida.

History 
In 1807, Ammi Ruhamah Mitchell and others petitioned for a bridge to provide a crossing of the Presumpscot River at its mouth with Casco Bay. Due to the War of 1812, plans for the bridge were put on hold.

In 1828, the Proprietors of the Martin's Point Bridge committee built the bridge, originally in toll form. 

The bridge was destroyed by drifting ice in 1861. Five years later, John Williams and almost two thousand other people petitioned that the bridge be rebuilt, as a toll-free crossing, at the expense of Cumberland County. The motion was authorized, and in 1868 a new, 2,050-foot-long bridge was completed. This bridge also carried the Portland and Yarmouth Electric Railway between 1898 and 1933.

The bridge was a drawbridge in the 20th century.

The Smelt Hill Dam, the first upriver dam from the bridge, was demolished in 2002. The process revealed the Presumpscot Falls for the first time in several hundred years.

References 

1828 establishments in Maine
Bridges completed in 2014
Casco Bay
Bridges in Portland, Maine
Buildings and structures in Falmouth, Maine
Bridges in Cumberland County, Maine